The 1978 Texas Rangers season involved the Rangers finishing 2nd in the American League West with a record of 87 wins and 75 losses.

Offseason 
 October 25, 1977: Gorman Thomas was sent to the Rangers by the Milwaukee Brewers to complete an earlier deal (the Brewers sent a player to be named later to the Rangers for Ed Kirkpatrick) made on August 20.
 November 10, 1977: Darold Knowles was purchased from the Rangers by the Montreal Expos.
 December 8, 1977: Bert Blyleven was traded by the Rangers to the Pittsburgh Pirates, Adrian Devine, Tommy Boggs, and Eddie Miller, were traded by the Rangers to the Atlanta Braves, and Tom Grieve and a player to be named later were traded by the Rangers to the New York Mets as part of a 4-team trade. Al Oliver and Nelson Norman were traded by the Pirates to the Rangers, and Jon Matlack was traded by the Mets to the Rangers. John Milner was traded by the Mets to the Pirates. Willie Montañez was traded by the Braves to the Mets. The Rangers completed the deal by sending Ken Henderson to the Mets on March 15, 1978.
 January 25, 1978: Gaylord Perry was traded by the Rangers to the San Diego Padres for Dave Tomlin and $125,000.
 February 28, 1978: David Clyde and Willie Horton were traded by the Rangers to the Cleveland Indians for Tom Buskey and John Lowenstein.

Regular season

Season standings

Record vs. opponents

Notable transactions 
 June 6, 1978: 1978 Major League Baseball Draft
Wayne Tolleson was drafted by the Rangers in the 8th round.
Charlie O'Brien was drafted by the Rangers in the 14th round, but did not sign.
Mike Richardt was drafted by the Rangers in the 1st round (10th pick) of the Secondary Phase.

Roster

Player stats

Batting

Starters by position 
Note: Pos = Position; G = Games played; AB = At bats; H = Hits; Avg. = Batting average; HR = Home runs; RBI = Runs batted in

Other batters 
Note: G = Games played; AB = At bats; H = Hits; Avg. = Batting average; HR = Home runs; RBI = Runs batted in

Pitching

Starting pitchers 
Note: G = Games pitched; IP = Innings pitched; W = Wins; L = Losses; ERA = Earned run average; SO = Strikeouts

Other pitchers 
Note: G = Games pitched; IP = Innings pitched; W = Wins; L = Losses; ERA = Earned run average; SO = Strikeouts

Relief pitchers 
Note: G = Games pitched; W = Wins; L = Losses; SV = Saves; ERA = Earned run average; SO = Strikeouts

Awards and honors 
Jim Sundberg, Gold Glove, catcher

All-Stars 
All-Star Game

Farm system 

LEAGUE CHAMPIONS: GCL Rangers

Notes

References

External links 
1978 Texas Rangers team page at Baseball Reference
1978 Texas Rangers team page at www.baseball-almanac.com

Texas Rangers seasons
Texas Rangers season
Texas Rang